Robert Carl Zuppke (July 2, 1879 – December 22, 1957) was an American football coach.  He served as the head coach at the University of Illinois at Urbana–Champaign from 1913 until 1941, compiling a career college football record of 131–81–12.  Inducted into the College Football Hall of Fame in 1951, Zuppke coached his teams to national titles in 1914, 1919, 1923, and 1927.  Zuppke's teams also won seven Big Ten Conference championships. While at the University of Illinois, Zuppke was a member of the Alpha-Gamma chapter of Kappa Sigma. Among the players Zuppke coached at Illinois was Red Grange, the era's most celebrated college football player. The field at the University of Illinois's Memorial Stadium is named Zuppke Field in his honor. Zuppke is credited for many football inventions and traditions, including the huddle and the flea flicker. In 1914, he reintroduced the I formation.

Prior to coaching at the University of Illinois, Zuppke coached at Muskegon High School in Muskegon, Michigan, and Oak Park and River Forest High School in Oak Park, Illinois, where he tutored future Pro Football Hall of Famer George Trafton and Olympic decathlete Harry Goelitz. Zuppke led the team to state championships in 1911 and 1912. He had several coaching influences. He used some plays developed by Pop Warner.

Zuppke also was a writer and a fine art painter. From 1930 to 1948, Zuppke wrote the syndicated newspaper strip Ned Brant, drawn by Walt Depew. During the 1930s, Zuppke also wrote syndicated sports-related columns. As a painter, Zuppke was known for his rugged Western landscapes.

Zuppkeisms
Zuppke was given to philosophical remarks, known as "Zuppkeisms." The seven best-known are as follows:

 Never let hope elude you; that is life's biggest failure
 The greatest athlete is one who can carry a nimble brain to the place of action
 Moral courage is the result of respect from fellow men
 A good back should keep his feet at all times and never lose his head
 Men do their best if they know they are being observed
 Alumni are loyal if a coach wins all his games
 Advice to freshmen: don't drink the liniment

Artist
Zuppke was also a painter who worked mainly on creating evocative, naturalistic landscapes depicting the American Southwest. Zuppke saw no conflict between his interest in painting and football strategy as he believed, "Art and football are very much alike". His work was displayed in several shows, including a one-man show at the Palmer House in Chicago in 1937. Zuppke was a member of the No-Jury Society of Artists in Chicago and an acquaintance of Ernest Hemingway. Images of Zuppke alongside some of his paintings can be found in the University of Illinois Archives.

Head coaching record

College

See also
 List of presidents of the American Football Coaches Association

References

Bibliography

External links
 
 Muskegon Area Sports Hall of Fame bio
 

1879 births
1957 deaths
20th-century American painters
20th-century American male artists
American comics writers
American landscape painters
American male painters
American men's basketball players
Illinois Fighting Illini football coaches
Milwaukee Panthers football players
Wisconsin Badgers men's basketball players
High school football coaches in Illinois
High school football coaches in Michigan
College Football Hall of Fame inductees
Sportspeople from Berlin
Sportspeople from Muskegon, Michigan
Basketball players from Milwaukee
Players of American football from Milwaukee
German emigrants to the United States